John Anthony Dennis (born 1 December 1963 in Eton, Berkshire) is a former professional footballer who played as a midfielder.

Career

Dennis played for football league clubs Plymouth Argyle, Exeter City, Chesterfield, Colchester United, Lincoln City and made more than 100 appearances for Cambridge United in a career that spanned 17 years.

Honours

Club
Cambridge United
 Football League Third Division Winner (1): 1990–91
 Football League Fourth Division Playoff Winner (1): 1989–90

References

External links
 
 Tony Dennis at Colchester United Archive Database

1963 births
English footballers
People from Eton, Berkshire
Plymouth Argyle F.C. players
Colchester United F.C. players
Exeter City F.C. players
Bideford A.F.C. players
Taunton Town F.C. players
Slough Town F.C. players
Cambridge United F.C. players
Chesterfield F.C. players
Lincoln City F.C. players
Gainsborough Trinity F.C. players
Ilkeston Town F.C. (1945) players
Living people
Association football midfielders